Vincent Kirabo Amooti, who was born on 1 October 1955, in Hoima District in the Western Region of Uganda, serves as the bishop of the Roman Catholic Diocese of Hoima, effective 30 November 2015.

Priesthood
He was ordained a priest on 9 September 1979 after studying at the Uganda Martyrs' National Major Seminary Aloculum in Gulu and at St. Mary's National Seminary in Ggaba. He taught at St. John Bosco Minor Seminary, Hoima from 1979 until 1988. He served as the director of the Diocesan Commission for Vocations from 1985 until 1988. He was the vicar at Muhorro Parish in 1990 and rector of St. John Bosco Minor Seminary in Hoima from 1991 until 1992. Between 1992 and 1997, he served as the diocesan financial administrator of Hoima Roman Catholic Diocese. Between 1998 and 2003, he was the parish priest of Buseesa Parish, serving in the same capacity in Katulikire Parish from 2007 until 2008. He became professor and financial administrator of Uganda Martyrs' National Major Seminary Alokolum in 2008, serving in that capacity until 2012. At the time of his appointment as bishop, he was a professor at St. Mary’s National Major Seminary Ggaba, a position he had served in since 2012.

As bishop
Kirabo was appointed bishop by Pope Francis, on 30 November 2015 and was consecrated as Bishop of Hoima on 28 February 2016 by Archbishop Paul Kamuza Bakyenga, Archbishop of Mbarara, assisted by Bishop Albert Edward Baharagate, Bishop Emeritus of Hoima and Bishop Lambert Bainomugisha, Auxiliary Bishop of Mbarara and Titular Bishop of Tacia Montana.

See also
 Emmanuel Nsubuga
 Emmanuel Wamala
 Uganda Martyrs

References

External links
Bishop Kirabo Roots For Wealth Creation As of 22 May 2019.

1955 births
Living people
People from Hoima District
21st-century Roman Catholic bishops in Uganda
University of Portland alumni
Pontifical Urban University alumni
People from Western Region, Uganda
Roman Catholic bishops of Hoima